Koo Bon-hyeok is a South Korean football player. He plays for Chungju Citizen FC.

Career
Koo Bon-hyeok joined J2 League club Montedio Yamagata in 2016. On September 3, 2016, he debuted in Emperor's Cup (v Thespakusatsu Gunma).

Club statistics
Updated to 20 February 2018.

References

External links

1998 births
Living people
South Korean footballers
Association football midfielders
J2 League players
Korea National League players
K League 2 players
K4 League players
Montedio Yamagata players
Tegevajaro Miyazaki players
Gimhae FC players
FC Anyang players